"The Blue Hotel" is a short story by American author Stephen Crane (1871–1900). It first appeared in 1898 in two installments in Collier's Weekly, on November 26 and on December 3, 1898. It subsequently was republished in the collection The Monster and Other Stories.

Background
It is one of the most well known of the short stories in the collection The Monsters and Other Stories. Although it appears to be a reasonably simple tale about a man who encounters trouble following a stay at the Palace Hotel, several complex themes underpin the story and define many of the overarching themes in novels like Maggie: A Girl of the Streets and more generally, Crane’s corpus. Stylistically, the story breaks free from the norms of the period, often entering the realms of Expressionism, an unusual style to encounter in American literature.

Adaptations
 1999: The Coxcomb (1999 album), a musical  adaptation  by David Grubbs

References

External links 

"The Blue Hotel", full text on the Washington State University website

Short stories by Stephen Crane
1899 short stories
Works originally published in Collier's